The 55th Regiment Indiana Infantry was an infantry regiment that served in the Union Army during the American Civil War.

Service
The 55th Indiana Infantry was organized at Indianapolis, Indiana and mustered in for three months' service on June 16, 1862.

The regiment was attached to Manson's Brigade, Army of Kentucky, District of Central Kentucky.

The 55th Indiana Infantry mustered out beginning September 6, 1862 through October 23, 1862.

Detailed service
Duty at Camp Morton, Indiana, guarding prisoners until August. Operations against Morgan July 4-28. Ordered to Kentucky, August. Battle of Richmond, Kentucky, August 30. Mostly captured. Paroled and sent to Indianapolis, Indiana.

Casualties
The regiment lost a total of 13 men during service; 1 officer and 9 enlisted men killed or mortally wounded, and 3 enlisted men died of disease.

Commanders
 Lieutenant Colonel John R. Mahan - commanded at the battle of Richmond

Notable members
 Private Ivory Kimball, Company E - primary advocate for the Arlington Memorial Amphitheater at Arlington National Cemetery

See also

 List of Indiana Civil War regiments
 Indiana in the Civil War

References
 Dyer, Frederick H. A Compendium of the War of the Rebellion (Des Moines, IA: Dyer Pub. Co.), 1908.
Attribution
 

Military units and formations established in 1862
Military units and formations disestablished in 1862
Units and formations of the Union Army from Indiana
1862 establishments in Indiana